For information on all Lamar University sports, see Lamar Cardinals and Lady Cardinals

The 2020 Lamar Cardinals baseball team represented Lamar University in the 2020 NCAA Division I baseball season.  The Cardinals played their home games at Vincent–Beck Stadium and are members of the Southland Conference.  The team was coached by Will Davis in his 4th season at Lamar.  On March 12, the Southland Conference announced a suspension of Spring sports through March 30  due to the COVID-19 pandemic.  The conference announced that all remaining Spring 2020 sports contests were cancelled on March 14.

The Cardinals played 15 games in the shortened season with an overall record of 7–8, and a 0–3 record in conference play.

Previous season
In 2019, the Cardinals  finished the season 13th in the Southland with a record of 18–36, 9–21 in conference play. They failed to qualify for the 2019 Southland Conference baseball tournament.

Southland Conference Coaches and Sports Information Directors Poll
The Southland Conference Coaches and Sports Information Directors Poll was released on February 6, 2020. Lamar was picked to finish twelfth in the Southland Conference with 87 votes.

Preseason All-Southland Conference team
The preseason all-conference team is based on votes by the conference head coaches.  Players who were named to the previous season's first and second teams are automatically named to the preseason team for their respective positions.
Ryan Flores^ (UIW, JR, 1st Base)
Nate Fisbeck^ (MCN, SR, 2nd Base)
Beau Orlando^ (UCA, SR, 3rd Base)
JC Correa^ (LU, SR, Shortstop)
Gavin Johnson (SHSU, SR, Catcher)
Clayton Rasbeary^ (MCN, SR, Designated Hitter)
Sean Arnold^ (UIW, SR, Outfield)
Brandon Bena^ (HBU, SR, Outfield)
Colton Cowser^ (SHSU, SO, Outfield)
Noah Cameron^ (UCA, SO, Starting Pitcher)
Will Dion (MCN, SO, Starting Pitcher)
Kyle Gruller^ (HBU, SR, Starting Pitcher)
Conner Williams (UCA, SR, Relief Pitcher)
Itchy Burts^ (TAMUCC, SR, Utility)
^2019 All-Conference Designation

Roster

Coaches

Schedule
Sources:

References

Lamar Cardinals baseball seasons
Lamar
Lamar Cardinals baseball team
Lamar Cardinals baseball team